Skrat may refer to:

 Skrat, a mythical creature from Scandinavian folklore
 Skrat, Blagoevgrad Province, a village in Petrich Municipality, Bulgaria
It could also be a misspelling of
 Scrat, a saber-toothed squirrel (fictional species) in the animated movie Ice Age and its sequels